Boogardie is an abandoned town in the Mid West region of Western Australia.

Ghost town
The now derelict town in Western Australia, near the town of Mount Magnet, was established in 1898.

Due to its proximity to Mount Magnet and Lennonville some facilities were shared in the time of it being an active mining field. The mining field was incorporated in geological and mining surveys; at the time it was called the Murchison goldfield.

The name has its origins in an Aboriginal word but the meaning is unknown.

Mining era
Boogardie had its own state battery in the early 20th century.

The Sidar and Zion leases of the Hill 50 Gold Mine were located near Boogardie and mined from 1936 onwards, when Hill 50 Gold Mines Ltd started operating the mine.

References 

Mining towns in Western Australia
Ghost towns in Western Australia
Shire of Mount Magnet